The UAAP Season 79 basketball tournaments are held in school year 2016–17. University of Santo Tomas is the season host while Far Eastern University are the defending champions. ABS-CBN's UHF channel ABS-CBN Sports and Action broadcast the men's tournament for the seventeenth consecutive year.

Men's tournament

Teams

Elimination round

Team standings

Match-up results

Scores

Bracket

 Game went into overtime.

Semifinals
In the semifinals, the higher seed has the twice-to-beat advantage, where they only have to win once, while their opponents twice, to progress.

La Salle vs. Adamson
The De La Salle Green Archers has the twice-to-beat advantage.

Ateneo vs. FEU
The Ateneo Blue Eagles has the twice-to-beat advantage.

Finals
This is the fifth overall Finals matchup between the De La Salle Green Archers and the Ateneo Blue Eagles. The Blue Eagles won their last encounter in 2008.

 Finals Most Valuable Player:

Broadcast notes
All games will be aired on S+A Channel 23, S+A HD Channel 166, TFC.tv and sports.abs-cbn.com. Game 1 was also simulcast on ABS-CBN Channel 2 and ABS-CBN HD Channel 167.

Awards 

 Most Valuable Player: 
 Rookie of the Year: 
 Mythical Team:

Sponsored awards
 Chooks-to-go Sportsmanship Award: 
 Appeton Most Improved Player: 
 PS Bank PSBankable Player: 
 Manulife Up and Coming Player of the Season: 
 Kopiko 78's Recharged Player:

Players of the Week

Seniors coaching changes and suspensions
Out of 8 competing teams in the UAAP, 5 teams has changed their head coach starting Season 79.

Adamson Soaring Falcons: Former DLSU Green Archers coach and current GlobalPort Batang Pier team consultant Franz Pumaren will call the shots for the Falcons, replacing interim coach Mike Fermin who is relegated as part of the coaching staff.
Ateneo Blue Eagles: Long-time assistant coach Sandy Arespacochaga will mentor the Blue Eagles starting this season, replacing Bo Perasol who moved to the UP Fighting Maroons. Arespacochaga will be assisted by Philippines men's national basketball team head coach Tab Baldwin as a team consultant. With Baldwin seen calling out the plays, and other teams complaining about his exemption from receiving technical fouls, the UAAP Board subsequently ordered him designated as Ateneo's coach, making him eligible to receive technical fouls.
De La Salle Green Archers: Erstwhile NCAA champion coach Aldin Ayo of the Letran Knights was named as head coach of the Green Archers, replacing resigned head coach Juno Sauler.
UP Fighting Maroons: Former Ateneo Blue Eagles head coach Bo Perasol returned to his alma mater as the new head coach of the Fighting Maroons, replacing Renzy Bajar who handled the team in Season 78.
UST Growling Tigers: Blackwater Elite assistant coach Rodil "Boy" Sablan took over from the controversial former head coach Bong Dela Cruz as the head mentor of the Growling Tigers.

Women's tournament

Elimination round

Team standings

Match-up results

Scores

Fourth–seed playoff

Bracket

Stepladder semifinals

First round
This is a one-game playoff.

Second round
In the semifinals, La Salle has the twice-to-beat advantage, where they only have to win once, while their opponents twice, to progress.

Finals
This is a best-of-three playoff.

Awards 

 Most Valuable Player: 
 Mythical Five:

Juniors' tournament

Elimination round

Team standings

Match-up results

Scores

Bracket

Fourth–seed playoff

Second–seed playoff

Semifinals

NU vs. La Salle
In the semifinals, NU has the twice-to-beat advantage, where they only have to win once, while their opponents twice, to progress.

FEU vs. Ateneo
The FEU Baby Tamaraws had the twice-to-beat advantage after beating the Ateneo Blue Eaglets for the second-seed, which led to a virtual best-of-three playoff series.

Finals

Awards 

 Most Valuable Player: 
 Rookie of the Year: 
 Mythical Team:

Overall Championship points

Seniors' division

In case of a tie, the team with the higher position in any tournament is ranked higher. If both are still tied, they are listed by alphabetical order.

How rankings are determined:
 Ranks 5th to 8th determined by elimination round standings.
 Loser of the #1 vs #4 semifinal match-up is ranked 4th
 Loser of the #2 vs #3 semifinal match-up is ranked 3rd
 Loser of the finals is ranked 2nd
 Champion is ranked 1st

See also
NCAA Season 92 basketball tournaments

References

79
2016–17 in Philippine college basketball
Basket